Falsimargarita iris is a species of sea snail, a marine gastropod mollusk in the family Calliostomatidae.

Description
The height of the shell attains 20 mm. The thin, whitish, opalescent shell has a depressed turbinate shape. It is narrowly umbilicate. It contains 5 whorls. The apical whorls is smooth, glossy, rounded and opaque white. The other whorls are rather convex. They are ornamented with spiral thread-like cords, four on the second whorl. about six or seven on the next, eight or nine on the penultimate whorl, and about forty on the body whorl. The threads vary in thickness, some being very much more slender than the others. The body whorl is obtusely subangled at the periphery. In the umbilical region it is opaque white and  smooth except for some growth lines. The whole surface of the shell exhibits curved lines of growth, but they are not strong enough to make the spiral lirae distinctly granose. The large aperture is subcircular and pearly within. The outer lip is thin. The white columella is obliquely arcuate, thickened, reflexed, and appressed to the umbilical region. This last characteristic is a peculiar feature.

Distribution
This marine species occurs in the Atlantic Ocean off Argentina and the Falkland Islands at depths between 10 m and 461 m.

References

External links
 To Biodiversity Heritage Library (4 publications)
 To USNM Invertebrate Zoology Mollusca Collection
 To World Register of Marine Species
 

iris
Gastropods described in 1915
Molluscs of the Atlantic Ocean